Ju Kwang-min (born 20 May 1990) is a North Korean footballer who plays as a goalkeeper for Kigwancha of the DPR Korea Premier Football League.

References

External links

Ju Kwang-min at DPRKFootball

1990 births
Living people
North Korean footballers
North Korea international footballers
Association football goalkeepers
2015 AFC Asian Cup players
Footballers at the 2010 Asian Games
Asian Games competitors for North Korea